Graham Shirley is an Australian author, researcher, curator and filmmaker best known for his work in the area of Australian film history.

He was one of the original class of the Australian Film Television and Radio School and is the co-author of Australian Cinema: The First Eighty Years, a classic history of the Australian film industry. He has also made a number of documentaries.

Filmography
 For the Term  of his Natural Life (1927) – restored film in 1981
 Allies (1983) – archival researcher
 The Dismissal (1983) – archival researcher
 Bodyline (1984) – archival researcher
 The Cowra Breakout (1984) – archival researcher
 Prisoners of Propaganda (1987) – researcher, writer, and director
 Wharfies (1988) – archival researcher
 Blood, Sweat and Tears (1988) – director (3 episodes)
 Wings Over Australia (1989) – archival researcher
 Hindsight (1990–91) – archival researcher
 Submarine: Sharks of Steel (1992) – archival researcher
 Timeframe – episode "Striking for State Aid" (1997)
 Federation (2001) – archival researcher
 Colour of War: The Anzacs (2003) – archival researcher
 Behind the Lines: The Secret War of Z Special Unit (2003) -writer, director
 White Bay Power (2003) – director
 Frank Hurley: The Man Who Made History (2004) – archival researcher
 Blowing Up Paradise (2004) – archival researcher
 Road to Tokyo (2005) – writer, director

References

External links
 
 Graham Shirley at National Film and Sound Archive

Australian filmmakers
Year of birth missing (living people)
Place of birth missing (living people)
Living people